Stormbreaker is the third solo album by former The La's bassist and Cast vocalist John Power.

It was released on 28 January 2008.

Track listing
All songs written by John Power.
 "Ain't No Woman"
 "Calling You Back"
 "American Dream"
 "Stormbreaker"
 "Distant Eyes"
 "Good Life"
 "Fire in My Heart"
 "Tombstone"
 "Cockerel Crow"
 "Come the Morning"

Personnel
John Power – guitar, vocals
Jay Lewis – bass
Steve Pilgrim – drums

References

External links

John Power (musician) albums
2008 albums